"Pass It On Down" is a song written by Randy Owen, Teddy Gentry, Ronnie Rogers and Will Robinson, and recorded by American country music group Alabama. It was released in March 1990 as the first single and title track from the album of the same name.  It peaked at number 3 in the United States, and number 2 in Canada.

Music video
The music video was directed by Jack Cole.

Chart positions

Year-end charts

References

Alabama (American band) songs
1990 singles
Songs written by Ronnie Rogers
Song recordings produced by Josh Leo
RCA Records Nashville singles
Songs written by Randy Owen
Songs written by Teddy Gentry
Songs written by Will Robinson (songwriter)
1990 songs
Environmental songs